The 2010 Budapest mayoral election was held on 3 October 2010 to elect the Mayor of Budapest (főpolgármester). On the same day, local elections were held throughout Hungary, including the districts of Budapest. The election was run using a First-past-the-post voting system. The winner of this election served for 4 years.

The election was won by the governing parties' candidate, István Tarlós.

Campaign

Five-term incumbent Gábor Demszky did not run, due to low approval and the collapse of his party SZDSZ.

Results

Notes

References 

2010 in Hungary
2010 elections in Europe
Local elections in Hungary
History of Budapest